Grandas de Salime is the capital city, and one of seven parishes (administrative divisions) in the municipality of Grandas de Salime, within the province and autonomous community of Asturias, in northern Spain. 

The population is 889 (INE 2006).

Villages and hamlets
 A Farrapa
 A Reigada
 Busmayor
 Carballo del Cuito
 Carballofalso
 Castiadelo
 Castro
 Cerexeira
 El Fabal
 El Salto
 Escanlares
 Grandas de Salime
 Llandecarballo
 Malneira
 Nogueiróu
 Padraira
 Paradela
 Pedre
 Robledo
 Salime
 Samayor
 San Julián
 Santa María
 Tresmonte da Buliqueira
 Valdedo
 Vilabolle
 Vilarello
 Villarmayor

References

Parishes in Grandas de Salime